Pardulus of Laon was bishop of Laon from 847 to 857. He is known for his participation in theological controversy. A letter of his to Hincmar of Reims is known.

Pardulus was a deacon of the cathedral of Reims before he became bishop. He was a bishop elect (episcopus vocatus) by April 847. In the early 850s he was an ally of Robert the Strong and on good terms with the king, Charles the Bald, and the queen, Ermentrude.

Notes

References

Bishops in the Carolingian Empire
Bishops of Laon
Writers from the Carolingian Empire
9th-century Latin writers